The 1917 election for Mayor of Los Angeles took place on May 1, 1917. Incumbent Frederick T. Woodman, who was appointed after the resignation of Charles E. Sebastian, was re-elected over former Mayor Meredith P. Snyder.

Municipal elections in California, including Mayor of Los Angeles, are officially nonpartisan; candidates' party affiliations do not appear on the ballot.

Election 
The previous mayor, Charles E. Sebastian, resigned on September 2, 1916 due to newspapers publishing letters between him and Lillian Pratt showing infidelity. After three days, the Los Angeles City Council named Frederic T. Woodman as the new mayor, with the term going well for Woodman. In the election, Woodman faced former Mayor Meredith P. Snyder, who previously led the city from 1900 to 1904. Sebastian also ran in the election to try and get his old job back, as well as Henry H. Roser (no relation to previous Mayor Henry H. Rose). In the election, Woodman won outright, preventing the need for a runoff.

Results

References and footnotes

External links
 Office of the City Clerk, City of Los Angeles

1917
1917 California elections
Los Angeles
1910s in Los Angeles